Vavilon is a rural locality (a selo) and the administrative center of Fruzensky Selsoviet, Aleysky District, Altai Krai, Russia. The population was 561 as of 2013. There are five streets.

Geography 
Vavilon is located on the Aley River, 12 km southeast of Aleysk (the district's administrative centre) by road. Zelyonaya Polyana is the nearest rural locality.

References 

Rural localities in Aleysky District